Wēkiu bug is the name given to two species of closely related flightless seed bugs in the genus Nysius that inhabit high elevations on the island of Hawaii.

Nysius aa is endemic to the area around the summit of Mauna Loa.
Nysius wekiuicola is endemic to the area around the summit of Mauna Kea.

Insects of Hawaii
Insect common names
Lygaeidae